Filippo Mazzei (but sometimes erroneously cited with the name of Philip Mazzie; Poggio a Caiano, December 25, 1730 – Pisa, March 19, 1816) was an Italian physician, winemaker, and arms dealer. A close friend of Thomas Jefferson, Mazzei acted as an agent to purchase arms for Virginia during the American Revolutionary War.

Biography
Mazzei was born Filippo Mazzei in Poggio a Caiano (Prato) in Tuscany as a son of Domenico and Elisabetta. He studied medicine in Florence and practiced in Italy and the Middle East for several years before moving to London in 1755 to take up a mercantile career as an importer. In London he worked as a teacher of Italian language. While in London he met the Americans Benjamin Franklin and Thomas Jefferson of Virginia. While doing work for Franklin, Mazzei shared his idea of importing Tuscan products, wine and olive trees, to the New World.  They convinced him to undertake his next venture.

On September 2, 1773, Mazzei boarded a ship from Livorno to Virginia bringing with him plants, seeds, silkworms, and 10 farmers from Lucca.  While he visited Jefferson at his estate, the two became good friends and Jefferson gave Mazzei a large allotment of land for an experimental plantation. Mazzei and Jefferson started what became the first commercial vineyard in the Commonwealth of Virginia. They shared an interest in politics and liberal values, and maintained an active correspondence for the rest of Mazzei's life.

In 1779 Mazzei returned to Italy as a secret agent for Virginia. He purchased and shipped arms to them until 1783. After briefly visiting the United States again in 1785, Mazzei travelled throughout Europe promoting republican ideals. He wrote a political history of the American Revolution, Recherches historiques et politiques sur les États-Unis de l'Amerique septentrionale, and published it in Paris in 1788. After its publication Mazzei became an unofficial roving ambassador in Europe for American ideas and institutions.

While in the Polish–Lithuanian Commonwealth he became attached as a Privy Councilor at the court of King Stanislaus II. There he became acquainted with Polish liberal and constitutional thought, like the works of Wawrzyniec Grzymała Goślicki and ideas of Golden Freedoms and Great Sejm. King Stanislaus appointed Mazzei to be Poland's representative in Paris, where he again met Jefferson.

After Poland was partitioned between Russia and Prussia in 1795, Mazzei, along with the rest of the Polish court, was given a pension by the Russian crown. He later spent more time in France, becoming active in the politics of the French Revolution under the Directorate. When Napoleon overthrew that government Mazzei returned to Pisa, Italy. He died there in 1816. After his death the remainder of his family returned to the United States at the urging of Jefferson. They settled in Massachusetts and Virginia; Mazzei's daughter married a nephew of John Adams. 

He was buried at the Suburbano Cemetery in Pisa.

Mazzei letter
Many biographers believe Jefferson and George Washington had a falling out over a letter Jefferson sent to Mazzei in Italy, which called the Washington Administration "Anglican, monarchical, and aristocratical," and claimed that Washington had appointed as military officers "all timid men that prefer the calm of despotism to the boisterous sea of liberty ... [I]t would give you a fever were I to name to you the apostates who have gone over to these heresies, men who were Samsons in the field and Solomons in the council, but who have had their heads shorn by the harlot England." The letter was eventually published overseas and then re-translated back into English by Noah Webster and published in the United States.

Acknowledgment
The contribution of Philip Mazzei to the U.S. Declaration of Independence was acknowledged by John F. Kennedy in his book A Nation of Immigrants, in which he states that:

Legacy
A 40-cent United States airmail stamp was issued in 1980 to commemorate the 250th anniversary of Mazzei's birth.

The World War II Liberty Ship  was named in his honor.

See also
 American Revolution
 Patrick Henry
 George Mason
 James Monroe
 William Paca
 Francesco Vigo
 John Page
 Founding Fathers of the United States
 List of important people in the era of the American Revolution

References

Mazzei's writings

In English

Philip Mazzei. My Life and Wanderings. Translated by S. Eugene Scalia. Edited by Margherita Marchione. Morristown, NJ: American Institute of Italian Studies, 1980. .

In French
 Filippo Mazzei: Recherches Historiques et Politiques sur les Etats-Unis de l'Amérique Septentrionale (Historical and Political Enquiries Concerning the United States of North America). Four Volumes.
 Filippo Mazzei, Stanisław August Poniatowski, Lettres de Philippe Mazzei et du roi Stanislas-Auguste de Pologne., Roma : Istituto storico italiano per l'età moderna e contemporanea, 1982

In Italian
 Filippo Mazzei: Memorie della vita e delle peregrinazioni del fiorentino Filippo Mazzei. a cura di Gino Capponi, Lugano, Tip. della Svizzera Italiana, 1845–1846, 2 volumes
 Filippo Mazzei: Del commercio della seta fatto in Inghilterra dalla Compagnia delle Indie Orientali (manoscritto inedito di Filippo Mazzei – 1769) a cura di Silvano Gelli, Poggio a Caiano, Comune di Poggio a Caiano, 2001.

Sources

In English
 Philip Mazzei: My Life and Wanderings, ed. Marchione, Sister Margherita, American Institute of Italian Studies, Morristown, NJ, 1980, 437pp. Translation to English of Mazzei's autobiography
 Marchione: Philip Mazzei: Selected Writings and Correspondence:
 Vol. I – Virginia's Agent during the American Revolution, XLVIII, 585 pp.;
 Vol. II – Agent for the King of Poland during the French Revolution, 802 pp.;
 Vol. III – World Citizen, 623 pp.
Cassa di Risparmi e Depositi, Prato, 1983.
 Marchione, Sister Margherita: Philip Mazzei: Jefferson's "Zealous Whig", American Institute of Italian Studies, Morristown, NJ, 1975, 352 pp.
 Marchione: The Adventurous Life of Philip Mazzei – La vita avventurosa di Filippo Mazzei (bilingue inglese – italiano), University Press of America, Lanham, MD, 1995, 235 pp.
 Marchione: The Constitutional Society of 1784, Center for Mazzei Studies, Morristown, NJ, 1984, 49 pp.
 Marchione: Philip Mazzei: World Citizen (Jefferson's "Zealous Whig"), University Press of America, Lanham, MD, 1994, 158 pp.
Renee Critcher Lyons: Foreign-Born American Patriots-Sixteen Volunteer Leaders In The Revolutionary War, 2014. North Carolina-McFarland Publishing

In Italian
 Filippo Mazzei: Scelta di scritti e lettere:
Vol.I: 1765–1788. Agente di Virginia durante la rivoluzione americana; pp. XLVII–582
Vol.II:1788–1791. Agente del Re di Polonia durante la Rivoluzione Francese; pp. XVI–703, XVII–633
Vol.III: 1792–1816. Cittadino del Mondo; pp. XVII–633
Prato, 1984, Ediz.del Palazzo per Cassa di Risparmi e Depositi di Prato.
 Marchione, Sister Margherita: Istruzioni per essere liberi ed eguali, Cisalpino-Gogliardica, Milan, 1984, 160 pp
 Marchione: The Adventurous Life of Philip Mazzei - La vita avventurosa di Filippo Mazzei (bilingue inglese – italiano), University Press of America, Lanham, MD, 1995, 235 pp

Others books about Mazzei

In English
 Biaggi, Mario: An Appreciation of Philip Mazzei – an Unsung American Patriot, in CONGRESSIONAL RECORD, Washington, D.C., September 12, 1984
 Di Grazia, Marco: Philip Mazzei, a hero of American independence. Illustrations and cover Marcello Mangiantini, translation Miranda MacPhail Tuscan Regional Government, Poggio a Caiano. nessuna data, circa 1990, 52p
 Gaines, William H.: Virginia History in Documents 1621-1788, Virginia State Library, Richmond, 1974
 Garlick, Richard, Jr: Philip Mazzei, Friend of Jefferson: His Life and letters, Baltimore-London-Paris, The Johns Hopkins Press-Humphrey Nilfort Oxford University Press – Société d'Editions Les Belles Lettres, 1933
 Garlick: Italy and the Italians in Washington's time, New York Arno Press, 1975
 Guzzetta, Charles: Mazzei in America, in DREAM STREETS – THE BIG BOOK OF ITALIAN AMERICAN CULTURE, Lawrence DiStasi editor, Harper & Row, New York, 1989
 Kennedy, John F.: A Nation of Immigrants, Harper & Row, New York, 1964
 Lippucci, Mary Theresa: The correspondence between Thomas Jefferson and Philip Mazzei, 1779–1815
 Malone, Dumas (editor): Dictionary of American Biography, VOL. VI, Charles Scribner's Sons, New York, 1933
 Marraro, Howard R.: An Unpublished Jefferson Letter to Mazzei, Italica, Vol. 35, No. 2 (June 1958), pp. 83–87
 Marraro: Jefferson Letters Concerning the Settlement of Mazzei's Virginia Estate, The Mississippi Valley Historical Review, Vol. 30, No. 2 (September 1943), pp. 235–242
 Marraro: Philip Mazzei - Virginia's Agent in Europe, New York Public Library, 1935
 Marraro: Philip Mazzei and his Polish friends sn,1944?
 Sammartino, Peter: The Contributions of Italians to the United States before the Civil War: a conference to celebrate the 250th anniversary of the birth of Philip Mazzei, Washington, D.C., April 18–20, 1980, Washington, D.C., National Italian American Foundation, 1980.
 Schiavo, Giovanni Ermenegildo: Philip Mazzei: one of America's founding fathers, New York: Vigo Press, 1951
 Masini, Giancarlo, Gori, Iacopo: How Florence Invented America - Vespucci, Verrazzano, Mazzei and their Contributions to the Conception of the New World, New York: Marsilio Publishers, 1999.

In Italian
 AA.VV., Dalla Toscana all'America: il contributo di Filippo Mazzei, Poggio a Caiano, Comune di Poggio a Caiano, 2004.
 Becattini Massimo, Filippo Mazzei mercante italiano a Londra (1756–1772), Poggio a Caiano, Comune di Poggio a Caiano, 1997.
 Bolognesi Andrea, Corsetti Luigi, Di Stadio Luigi: Filippo Mazzei mostra di cimeli e scritti, catalogo della mostra a cura di, Poggio a Caiano, palazzo Comunale, 3-25 luglio 1996, Comune di Poggio a Caiano, 1996.
 Camajani Guelfo Guelfi,Filippo Mazzei : un illustre toscano del Settecento : medico, agricoltore, scrittore, giornalista, diplomatico, Firenze, Associazione Internazionale Toscani nel Mondo, 1976.
 Ciampini Raffaele, Lettere di Filippo Mazzei alla corte di Polonia (1788–1792),  Bologna : N. Zanichelli, 1937
 Corsetti Luigi, Gradi Renzo: Bibliografia su Filippo Mazzei Avventuriero della Libertà a cura di, con scritti di Margherita Marchione e Edoardo Tortarolo, Poggio a Caiano, C.I.C Filippo Mazzei – Associazione Culturale "Ardengo Soffici", 1993.
 Di Stadio Luigi, Filippo Mazzei tra pubblico e privato. Raccolta di documenti inediti, a cura di, Poggio a Caiano, Biblioteca Comunale di Poggio a Caiano, 1996.
 Gerosa Guido, Il fiorentino che fece l'America. Vita e avventure di Filippo Mazzei 1730–1916, Milano, SugarCo Edizioni, 1990.
 Gradi Renzo, Un bastimento carico di Roba bestie e uomini in un manoscritto inedito di Filippo Mazzei, Poggio a Caiano, Comune di Poggio a Caiano, 1991.
 Gradi Renzo, Parigi: luglio 1789. Scritti e memorie del fiorentino Filippo Mazzei, a cura di, Comune di Poggio a Caiano, 1989.
 Gullace Giovanni, Figure dimenticate dell'indipendenza americana, Filippo Mazzei e Francesco Vigo, Roma : Il Veltro, 1977.
 Masini Giancarlo, Gori Iacopo, L'America fu concepita a Firenze, Firenze : Bonechi, 1998
 Tognetti Burigana Sara, Tra riformismo illuminato e dispotismo napoleonico; esperienze del "cittadino americano" Filippo Mazzei, Roma, Edizioni di Storia e letteratura, 1965.
 Tortarolo Edoardo, Illuminismo e Rivoluzioni. Biografia politica di Filippo Mazzei, Milano, Angeli, 1986.
 Łukaszewicz, Witold, Filippo Mazzei, Giuseppe Mazzini; saggi sui rapporti italo-polacchi, Wroclaw, Poland Zakład Narodowy im. Ossolińskich, 1970.

External links
 www.philipmazzei.us Official site 
 Monticello the home of Thomas Jefferson
 Philip Mazzei Encyclopædia Britannica
 A branch o Mazzei's Family Today
 Philip Mazzei at the Library of Congress
 Another Site about P.Mazzei and other famous Italian American

1730 births
1816 deaths
People from the Province of Prato
Grand Duchy of Tuscany people
Italian expatriates in the United States
Italian philosophers
18th-century Italian philosophers
Italian political writers
Italian emigrants to the United States
Italian people of the American Revolution
18th-century Italian physicians
Patriots in the American Revolution
Political philosophers
American spies during the American Revolution